Lyonetia is a genus of moths in the family Lyonetiidae.

Species

 Lyonetia alniella  Chambers, 1875
 Lyonetia anthemopa  Meyrick, 1936
 Lyonetia bakuchia  Kuroko, 1964
 Lyonetia boehmeriella  Kuroko, 1964
 Lyonetia boraginaceae  Ghesquière, 1940 (Congo)
 Lyonetia candida  Braun, 1916
 Lyonetia carcinota Meyrick, 1910 (Mauritius)
 Lyonetia castaneella  Kuroko, 1964
 Lyonetia clerkella  (Linnaeus, 1758) – apple leaf miner
 Lyonetia cotifraga Meyrick, 1909 (South Africa)
 Lyonetia embolotypa Turner, 1923   (Australia)
 Lyonetia euryella  Kuroko, 1964
 Lyonetia latistrigella  Walsingham, 1882
 Lyonetia lechrioscia Turner, 1926   (Australia)
 Lyonetia ledi  Wocke, 1859
 Lyonetia leurodes  Meyrick, 1915 (Sri Lanka)
 Lyonetia luxurians   Meyrick, 1922 (Fiji)
 Lyonetia melanochalca  Meyrick, 1911 (India)
 Lyonetia meridiana  Kuroko, 1982
 Lyonetia myricella  Kuroko, 1964
 Lyonetia penthesilea Meyrick, 1921 (Australia)
 Lyonetia photina Turner, 1923   (Australia)
 Lyonetia praefulva (Meyrick, 1911) (India and Sri Lanka)
 Lyonetia probolactis (Meyrick, 1911) (Seychelles)
 Lyonetia prunifoliella (Hübner, 1796)
 Lyonetia pulverulentella  Zeller, 1839
 Lyonetia saliciella  Busck, 1904
 Lyonetia scriptifera Meyrick, 1921  (Australia)
 Lyonetia spinitarsis   Meyrick 1922 (Fiji)
 Lyonetia torquens   Meyrick, 1922 (India)
 Lyonetia yasudai  Kuroko, 1964

References

 Meyrick, 1911. Descriptions of Indian Micro-Lepidoptera. Part XIV. Journal of the Bombay Natural History Society. Vol.XXI: 104–131.
 Meyrick. Exotic Lepidoptera II.

External links
 Lyonetia at funet
 De Prins, J. & De Prins, W. 2014. Afromoths, online database of Afrotropical moth species (Lepidoptera). World Wide Web electronic publication (www.afromoths.net) (03.Aug.2014)
 
 

Lyonetiidae
Moths described in 1825
Taxa named by Jacob Hübner